Complex analysis, traditionally known as the theory of functions of a complex variable, is the branch of mathematics that investigates functions of complex numbers. It is useful in many branches of mathematics, including number theory and applied mathematics; as well as in physics, including hydrodynamics, thermodynamics, and electrical engineering.

Overview
 Complex numbers
 Complex plane
 Complex functions
 Complex derivative
 Holomorphic functions
 Harmonic functions
 Elementary functions
 Polynomial functions
 Exponential functions
 Trigonometric functions
Hyperbolic functions
 Logarithmic functions
 Inverse trigonometric functions
Inverse hyperbolic functions
 Residue theory
 Isometries in the complex plane

Related fields

 Number theory
 Hydrodynamics
 Thermodynamics
 Electrical engineering

Local theory

Holomorphic function
Antiholomorphic function
Cauchy–Riemann equations
Conformal mapping
Conformal welding
Power series
Radius of convergence
Laurent series
Meromorphic function
Entire function
Pole (complex analysis)
Zero (complex analysis)
Residue (complex analysis)
Isolated singularity
Removable singularity
Essential singularity
Branch point
Principal branch
Weierstrass–Casorati theorem
Landau's constants
Holomorphic functions are analytic
Schwarzian derivative
Analytic capacity
Disk algebra

Growth and distribution of values

Ahlfors theory
Bieberbach conjecture
Borel–Carathéodory theorem
Corona theorem
Hadamard three-circle theorem
Hardy space
Hardy's theorem
Maximum modulus principle
Nevanlinna theory
Paley–Wiener theorem
Progressive function
Value distribution theory of holomorphic functions

Contour integrals

Line integral
Cauchy's integral theorem
Cauchy's integral formula
Residue theorem
Liouville's theorem (complex analysis)
Examples of contour integration
Fundamental theorem of algebra
Simply connected
Winding number
Principle of the argument
Rouché's theorem
Bromwich integral
Morera's theorem
Mellin transform
Kramers–Kronig relation, a. k. a. Hilbert transform
Sokhotski–Plemelj theorem

Special functions

Exponential function
Beta function
Gamma function
Riemann zeta function
Riemann hypothesis
Generalized Riemann hypothesis
Elliptic function
Half-period ratio
Jacobi's elliptic functions
Weierstrass's elliptic functions
Theta function
Elliptic modular function
J-function
Modular function
Modular form

Riemann surfaces

Analytic continuation
Riemann sphere
Riemann surface
Riemann mapping theorem
Carathéodory's theorem (conformal mapping)
Riemann–Roch theorem

Other

Amplitwist
Antiderivative (complex analysis)
Bôcher's theorem
Cayley transform
Harmonic conjugate
Hilbert's inequality
Method of steepest descent
Montel's theorem
Periodic points of complex quadratic mappings
Pick matrix
Runge approximation theorem
Schwarz lemma
Weierstrass factorization theorem
Mittag-Leffler's theorem
Sendov's conjecture
 Infinite compositions of analytic functions

Several complex variables
Biholomorphy
Cartan's theorems A and B
Cousin problems
Edge-of-the-wedge theorem
Several complex variables

History

People

 Augustin Louis Cauchy
 Leonhard Euler
 Carl Friedrich Gauss
 Jacques Hadamard
 Kiyoshi Oka
 Bernhard Riemann
 Karl Weierstrass
 Pierre Alphonse Laurent
 Brook Taylor
 Siméon Denis Poisson
 Hermann Schwarz
 Camille Jordan
 Carl Gustav Jacob Jacobi
 Eugène Rouché
 ,Gerardus Mercator
 Joseph Liouville
 Pierre-Simon Laplace
 August Ferdinand Möbius
 William Kingdon Clifford

Complex analysis
 
Complex analysis
Complex analysis